East Stewiacke, is a community in the Canadian province of Nova Scotia, located in  Colchester County.  It is mainly a farming and rural bedroom community, neighboured by the communities of Mackay Siding, West St Andrews, Alton and The Town of Stewiacke.

It is home to the Stewiacke River Park, on the Stewiacke River.

Communities in Colchester County
General Service Areas in Nova Scotia